Mara Galeazzi (born 1973) is an Italian ballet dancer. She was a Principal Dancer of The Royal Ballet.

Early life
Galeazzi was born in Brescia, Italy. At age 10, she started ballet training at La Scala Theatre Ballet School, where she graduated full marks.

Career
In 1992, at age 18, Galeazzi joined The Royal Ballet as an Artist. At the time, she didn't speak any English or know anyone in the company. The following year, while the company was on tour, she replaced an injured Gillian Revie as Mary Vetsera in Mayerling, with the approval of choreographer Kenneth MacMillan. She was promoted to First Artist in 1995, Soloist in 1998 and Principal in 2003. Her most notable roles in the company include Juliet in Romeo and Juliet, the title role in Anastasia, Tatiana in Onegin, the title role in The Firebird and the title role in Giselle. She has worked with choreographer such as Cathy Marston, Christopher Wheeldon, Wayne McGregor, Mats Ek, Jiri Kylian and William Forsythe, though she had never originated roles in MacMillan's works. Some of her performances were broadcast by the BBC. 

On Galeazzi's performance in Onegin, The Guardian noted her dancing "truly register the churning of the lovers' guts and the scorched sensitivity of their nerve endings." The Guardian also noted Galeazzi's portrayal of Mary Vetsera in Mayerling "is a terrifying blend of the naive and depraved"

As a guest artist, she performed in Italy, Germany and Scotland, including her hometown, Brescia. She has danced with Irek Mukhamedov, Carlos Acosta, Tetsuya Kumakawa and Edward Watson'

In 2013, Galeazzi left the Royal Ballet, in order to move to Oman to be with her husband, focus on new projects, teaching and charity works. She performed her final performance at the Royal Opera House on 13 June, dancing Mary Vetsera in Mayerling, with Edward Watson as her Rudolf. However, her final performance with the company is Manon in Monaco.

In 2014, Galeazzi returned to the Royal Ballet to dance the role of the mother in Ludovic Ondiviela's Cassandra at the Linbury Studio Theatre. Later, Galeazzi was asked by Wayne McGregor to cover for the leading role in Woolf Works, which was created on Alessandra Ferri. Though the work premiered in 2015, Galeazzi did not perform it until 2017. She also founded dance company M&T in Motion with Australian choreographer Tim Podesta. In 2016 she made her choreograph debut, which is a piece called Remembrance.
In 2017/18 guested with Wayne McGregor company with +/-Humans and Three of Codes.
In 2020 started acting courses and performed live first time in public in 2022 .
In 2019 started collaborating with Fabula Collective

Selected repertoire
Galeazzi's repertoire with The Royal Ballet includes:

Charity work
In 2005, Galeazzi organised a fundraising gala in Brescia for the research into child leukaemia. In 2007, she founded Dancing for the Children, to help children with HIV in Africa. She had since organised other galas in Africa, London and Italy, for causes including Syrian refugees.

Personal life
Galeazzi is married and has a daughter. Her husband is the Head of Operations of Royal Opera House Muscat. They live in  Muscat, Oman. She had suffered from a form of kidney disease while she was dancing.

Honours
Honorary member of Soroptimist International, 2005
Order of Merit of the Italian Republic, 2009

Source:

References

https://www.amazon.com/Shadow-Aspect-My-Journey-Expression/dp/B09BL7SFZ6

External links
 

1973 births
Living people
People from Brescia
Italian ballerinas
Principal dancers of The Royal Ballet
Prima ballerinas
Italian expatriates in England
Italian expatriates in Oman
21st-century ballet dancers
21st-century Italian dancers
Recipients of the Order of Merit of the Italian Republic
https://www.amazon.com/Shadow-Aspect-My-Journey-Expression/dp/B09BL7SFZ6